Georgios Daraklitsas (born 1 August 1968) is a Greek retired football midfielder.

References

1968 births
Living people
Greek footballers
Anagennisi Karditsa F.C. players
Aris Thessaloniki F.C. players
Ionikos F.C. players
Ethnikos Piraeus F.C. players
Agia Paraskevi F.C. players
Super League Greece players
Association football midfielders
Footballers from Karditsa